"Use Me" is a song, composed and originally recorded by Bill Withers, which was included on his 1972 album Still Bill. It was his second-biggest hit in the United States, released in September 1972 and later reaching No. 2 on the Billboard Hot 100 chart. It was kept from No. 1 by both "Ben" by Michael Jackson and "My Ding-a-Ling" by Chuck Berry.  "Use Me" also peaked at No. 2 on the soul chart for two weeks. Withers performed the song on Soul Train on November 4, 1972. Billboard ranked it as the No. 78 song for 1972. The song was certified Gold by the RIAA.  It is noted for its repeated bass figure which is heard alongside a complex rhythm in the percussion.

Music critic Robert Christgau called "Use Me" "one of the few knowledgeable songs about sex our supposedly sexy music has ever produced", featuring a "cross-class attraction" in its narrative.

Grace Jones covered the song - with a reggae-influenced arrangement - on her 1981 album Nightclubbing and  subsequently released the track as a single.

Personnel
 Bill Withers – vocals, guitar
 Ray Jackson – clavinet, Wurlitzer electric piano
 Benorce Blackmon – guitar
 Melvin Dunlap – bass guitar
 James Gadson – drums, percussion

Charts

Weekly charts

Year-end charts

Other recordings
A variety of artists have covered the song, including:

 Fiona Apple
 Patricia Barber
 Beans and Fatback
 Better Than Ezra
 Rick Braun from "Kisses in the Rain" (2001)
 D'Angelo
 Holly Golightly
 Gwar
 Ben Harper
 Isaac Hayes
 Vincent Herring, on the album Hard Times
 Hootie & the Blowfish, on their 2000 compilation album Scattered, Smothered and Covered
 The House Jacks, a cappella, on their 2007 live album Get Down Mr. President
 Ike & Tina Turner, on their 1998 album Absolutely The Best
 Mick Jagger featuring Lenny Kravitz and Flea on his third album Wandering Spirit (1993)
 Eran James 
 Al Jarreau 
 Grace Jones, on her 1981 album Nightclubbing
 Kimiko Kasai
 As a duet, Alicia Keys and Rob Thomas
 The Lachy Doley Group
 Lindsay Mac
 Liza Minnelli, on her 1973 album The Singer
 Ian Moss recorded a version for his sixth studio album, Soul on West 53rd (2009). 
 My Brightest Diamond
 Aaron Neville 
 Nicky Moore and the Blues Corporation
 Omar
 Esther Phillips, on her 1972 album Alone Again, Naturally.
 Raw Stylus
 Rockapella
 Kendrick Lamar Sampled the Song for His Song Sing About Me, I'm Dying of Thirst from the Album Good Kid, M.A.A.D City
 Slash's Blues Ball
 Tenth Avenue North
 UGK sampled the song for their track “Use Me Up” from their 1992 album Too Hard to Swallow
 Scott Walker, on his 1973 album Stretch
 Walter "Wolfman" Washington
 Junior Wells
 Fred Wesley & The J.B.'s
 Jim White (for the 2005 Starbucks compilation album, Sweetheart 2005: Love Songs)
 Widespread Panic 
 Zoobombs

References

1972 singles
Bill Withers songs
Songs written by Bill Withers
Liza Minnelli songs
Scott Walker (singer) songs
1972 songs
Sussex Records singles
Grace Jones songs